O'Bannon is a neighborhood of Louisville, Kentucky centered along Old LaGrange Road and Collins Lane (which is named after Levi Collins). O'Bannon was originally called Williamson after its first postmaster John Williamson, but was renamed in 1859 after postmaster John O'Bannon. The Post Office was located at the southwest corner of Old LaGrange Road and Collins Lane. O'Bannon Elementary School, which was located on Factory Lane, closed in 1960.

References

External links
O'Bannon resident to capture its history, The Courier-Journal, August 9, 2006

Neighborhoods in Louisville, Kentucky